"Sing Along" is a song co-written and recorded by American country music artist Rodney Atkins.  It was released in May 2002 as the first single from his 2003 album Honesty.  The song reached number 37 on the US Billboard Hot Country Singles & Tracks chart. Atkins wrote this song with Ted Hewitt and Bruce Gaitsch.

Chart performance

References

2002 singles
2002 songs 
Rodney Atkins songs
Songs written by Rodney Atkins
Curb Records singles
Songs written by Ted Hewitt
Songs written by Bruce Gaitsch